Marek Panáček (born 27 August 2002 in Uherské Hradište) is a Czech professional squash player. As of August 2022, he was ranked number 154 in the world.

References

2002 births
Living people
Czech male squash players